Michaela Dorfmeister (born 25 March 1973) is a former World Cup alpine ski racer from Austria. Her specialities were both the downhill and the super-G disciplines, although she skied in and had success in giant slalom.

Biography
Born in Vienna, Dorfmeister is the only daughter of a butcher by trade, and lived in Vienna until she was age six. She later studied at the Schladming ski academy, which has produced many of Austria's skiing greats.

Dorfmeister raced her first international season in 1983 and entered her first World Cup race in 1991 at Serre Chevalier coming 26. Her first podium place was in 1995 at the St. Anton downhill which she won. This was followed by a total of 25 victories (7 in downhill, 10 in super-G and 8 in giant slalom)

In 2000, she won the giant slalom World Cup, and in 2002 the overall World Cup. She won two more speciality World Cups, in 2003 (downhill) and 2005 (super-G). At the 2006 Winter Olympics, she won the gold medal in the downhill and super-G races.

Dorfmeister's win in the Hafjell super-G on 3 March 2006 made her the oldest woman to win a World Cup race.

World Cup results

Season titles

Season standings

Race victories
25 wins (7 DH, 10 SG, 8 GS)
64 podiums

World Championship results

Olympic results

References

External links
 
 
 Michaela Dorfmeister World Cup standings at the International Ski Federation 
 
 

1973 births
Austrian female alpine skiers
Alpine skiers at the 1998 Winter Olympics
Alpine skiers at the 2002 Winter Olympics
Alpine skiers at the 2006 Winter Olympics
Olympic alpine skiers of Austria
Medalists at the 1998 Winter Olympics
Medalists at the 2006 Winter Olympics
Olympic medalists in alpine skiing
Olympic gold medalists for Austria
Olympic silver medalists for Austria
FIS Alpine Ski World Cup champions
Sportspeople from Vienna
Living people
20th-century Austrian women
21st-century Austrian women